Katherine Crown (born November 23, 1985) is a Canadian voice actress and writer. She is known for voicing Izzy in Total Drama, Fin in Stoked, Mary Wendle and Melanie Baker in Clarence, Tulip in Storks and Ivy in Amphibia.

In 2013, automotive financing company DriveTime hired Crown, along with Nicole Randall Johnson, for an advertising campaign called DriveTime Girls. The actresses portrayed an eccentric duo of mobile credit approval agents who dealt with “rescuing” potential car buyers rejected for financing by other automotive dealers. Katie's character was flatulent, something they wrote in last minute to accommodate Katie's bad reaction to a medication. The campaign ran from late 2013 throughout 2014.

Filmography

Animation

Live action

References

External links
 
 

Living people
Actresses from Los Angeles
Actresses from Ontario
Canadian expatriate actresses in the United States
Canadian voice actresses
Canadian women comedians
People from Oakville, Ontario
21st-century American women
1985 births